Kul Tepe may refer to:

Kültəpə, Azerbaijan
Kültepe, Turkey
Kul Tepe Jolfa, Iran
Gol Tappeh (disambiguation), places in Iran